Lise-Lotte Djerf (born 17 March 1963) is a Swedish archer. She competed in the women's individual and team events at the 1992 Summer Olympics.

References

External links
 

1963 births
Living people
Swedish female archers
Olympic archers of Sweden
Archers at the 1992 Summer Olympics
People from Huskvarna
Sportspeople from Jönköping County
20th-century Swedish women